The buff-browed foliage-gleaner (Syndactyla rufosuperciliata) is a species of bird in the family Furnariidae.
It is found in Argentina, Bolivia, Brazil, Ecuador, Paraguay, Peru, and Uruguay.
Its natural habitats are subtropical or tropical moist lowland forest and subtropical or tropical moist montane forest.

References

buff-browed foliage-gleaner
Birds of Brazil
Birds of Uruguay
Birds of Argentina
Birds of the Puna grassland
buff-browed foliage-gleaner
Taxonomy articles created by Polbot